Haroune Moussa Camara (born 1 January 1998) is a Saudi Arabian footballer of Guinean origin who plays as a striker for Al-Ittihad in the Saudi Professional League.

Career statistics

Club

 Assist Goals

International

Honours

Al-Ittihad
Saudi Super Cup: 2022

External links

References

1998 births
Living people
Sportspeople from Riyadh
Association football forwards
Saudi Arabian footballers
Saudi Arabia youth international footballers
Saudi Arabia international footballers
Al-Qadsiah FC players
Ittihad FC players
Saudi Professional League players
Footballers at the 2018 Asian Games
Asian Games competitors for Saudi Arabia
21st-century Saudi Arabian people
20th-century Saudi Arabian people
Naturalised citizens of Saudi Arabia